Creagh may refer to:

People
 Ben Creagh, Australian Rugby player
 Frank Creagh, New Zealand boxer
 Michael Creagh (politician), Irish politician and soldier
 Garrett O'Moore Creagh, British officer
 Michael O'Moore Creagh, British officer

Placenames
 Creagh, County Cork, a civil parish in County Cork, Republic of Ireland
 Creagh, County Fermanagh, a townland in County Fermanagh, Northern Ireland
 Creagh, a civil parish in County Galway and County Roscommon, Republic of Ireland